Marián Bokor (born 17 April 1977) is a male javelin thrower from Slovakia. His personal best is 83.38 metres, achieved in July 2000 in Nitra.

He finished eighth at the 2005 Summer Universiade. In addition he competed at the 2005 World Championships and the Olympic Games in 2000 and 2004 without reaching the final.

Competition record

Seasonal bests by year
2000 - 83.38
2002 - 76.91
2003 - 76.09
2004 - 80.72
2005 - 77.79
2006 - 81.91
2007 - 75.49
2008 - 74.19
2009 - 73.49

References

1977 births
Living people
Slovak male javelin throwers
Athletes (track and field) at the 2000 Summer Olympics
Athletes (track and field) at the 2004 Summer Olympics
Olympic athletes of Slovakia
Competitors at the 2005 Summer Universiade